Vasyl Hrybovych (born 23 January 1970) is a Ukrainian ski jumper. He competed in the normal hill and large hill events at the 1994 Winter Olympics.

References

1970 births
Living people
Ukrainian male ski jumpers
Olympic ski jumpers of Ukraine
Ski jumpers at the 1994 Winter Olympics
Place of birth missing (living people)